Li Qun (born Hao Lichun; 1912 10 February 2012) was a Chinese artist known for his woodcuts.

Early life
A native of Lingshi County, Shanxi, Li attended the Hangzhou National Art Academy and set up its Woodcut Research Association in 1933. He became acquainted with Lu Xun, who encouraged him to pursue a career in making woodcuts.

Career

Li was an early member of the Committee of Shanghai Woodcut Artists, whose membership included the likes of Chen Yanqiao and Jiang Yan. In 1940, Li started teaching at Lu Xun's art school. Five years later, he joined the Federation of Literature and Arts of Jin-Sui Bordering Region and was editor of the Jin-Sui People's Pictorial. He attended the inaugural National Congress of Literature and Arts in July 1949 and became a member of both the Standing Committee of China Association of Knights of the Brush and the China Federation of Literature and the Arts. He was also chairman of the Shanxi Provincial Association of Literature and Arts and editor of the Shanxi Pictorial.

In 1952, Li relocated to Beijing and was employed by the People's Fine Art Publishing House. He served on the editorial team of the journal Fine Arts, while continuing to actively produce woodcuts. In his lifetime, Li held some eighteen art exhibitions; most of his artworks depict life in China either before or after Communism. Described as a social realist, Li was critical of Chinese expressionists whose artworks, in his view, had "returned to the ivory tower" and were "far away from life".

Death
Li died from respiratory failure at 22:10 on 10 February 2012 at Beijing Chaoyang Hospital, at the age of 100.

References

Citations

Works cited

 
 
 

1912 births
2012 deaths
Deaths from respiratory failure
Chinese centenarians
20th-century Chinese artists
People from Lingshi County